The Supreme Council of the Arabic language in Algeria is an advisory body to the President of the Republic of Algeria, established by Order No. 96/30 of December 21, 1996, as amended and supplemented to the law 91-05 of 16 January 1991.

Council which has members and chaired by working to upgrade the Arabic language in Algeria and their uses.

Address 
Franklin Roosevelt Street POB: 575 Didouche Mourad
Algiers Algeria 16 000

See also 
 Algerian Association for the Defence of the Arabic language

External links 
 Supreme Council of the Arabic language in Arabic

Arabic language regulators
Languages of Algeria
Government agencies of Algeria